Dottie May Frazier (July 15, 1922 – February 8, 2022) was an American diver, designer, and dive shop owner. Her life is chronicled in her autobiography, Trailblazer: The Extraordinary Life of Diving Pioneer, Dottie Frazier. She was the first female scuba instructor and the first female dive shop owner.

Early life 
Dorothy Adele Reider was born on July 15, 1922, in Long Beach, California, to parents Francis and Laura Davis Reider. She was injured in the 1933 Long Beach earthquake. She graduated from Long Beach Polytechnic High School in 1939.

Career 
Frazier began teaching freediving in the 1940s. During World War II she worked for Douglas Aircraft Company. In 1955, Frazier became a certified scuba instructor and was the first woman in the United States to do so. She also created some of the first wetsuit patterns for women. The suits were developed under the name Penguin Suits in conjunction with Frazier's dive shop, Penguin Dive Shop. Penguin was the first female-owned dive shop. After the birth of her third son, Frazier founded Aqua Families, a club of divers who dove with their children.

Personal life and death 
Frazier had four sons and was married three times. She died in Long Beach on February 8, 2022, at the age of 99.

Awards 
Frazier was inducted into the Women Divers Hall of Fame in 2000. In 2019, Frazier was awarded the Historical Diving Society's Diving Pioneer Award.

References 

1922 births
2022 deaths
American freedivers
People from Long Beach, California
Underwater diving pioneers
Long Beach Polytechnic High School alumni